Rhodium pentafluoride is an inorganic compound with the formula Rh4F20.  It is a red solid. It is prepared by fluorination of rhodium trifluoride at 400 °C.  

According to X-ray crystallography, the Rh centers are octahedral.  The structure is very similar to that of the related ruthenium pentafluoride, osmium pentafluoride, and iridium pentafluoride.  All are tetrameric, meaning that they have the molecular structure [MF5]4.  The M-F distances for the bridging fluoride ligands are typically about 0.2 Å longer than the Rh-F distances for the nonbridging fluoride ligands.  In the case of rhodium pentafluoride, these distances average 1.999(4) and 1.808(8) Å.  The Rh-F-Rh angles average 135°, which leads to a ruffled structure.  In contrast, the M-F-M centers are linear in the pentafluorides of niobium, tantalum, molybdenum, and tungsten.

References

Rhodium compounds
Fluorides
Platinum group halides